G. R. Point is a play about the Vietnam War by the American playwright and Vietnam war veteran David Berry.

The G.R. in the title stands for "Graves Registration", with the play focusing on soldiers whose task it is to package the dead in black plastic bags for shipment back to the United States. 

G. R. Point, Berry's first play, won an Obie Award for Distinguished Playwriting and a Drama Desk Nomination for Best New American Play in 1977.

See also
List of plays with anti-war themes

References

American plays
1977 plays
Vietnam War fiction
Anti-war plays
1970s debut plays
Off-Broadway plays
Obie Award-winning plays